Vahan Janjigian is Chief Investment Officer at Greenwich Wealth Management LLC, former Editor of the Money Masters Stock Report investment newsletter, a former Forbes magazine columnist, and former Editor of the Forbes Special Situation Survey. He is author of Even Buffett Isn't Perfect  and co-author of The Forbes/CFA Institute Investment Course.  Janjigian previously served on the faculties of several universities including the University of Delaware, Northeastern University, the American University of Armenia, and Boston College. He received his B.S. from Villanova University, and his MBA and Ph.D. from Virginia Tech.

References

External links
 Even Buffett Isn't Perfect
 The Forbes/CFA Institute Investment Course

American businesspeople
University of Delaware faculty
Northeastern University faculty
Boston College faculty
Living people
Villanova University alumni
Virginia Tech alumni
American people of Armenian descent
Year of birth missing (living people)